Sebastião de Freitas Couto Júnior, better known as Sebá (born June 8, 1992) is a Brazilian professional footballer who plays mainly as a winger for Super League Greece club Ionikos.

Career
Born in Salvador, Bahia, Sebá started his career in the Brazilian team Cruzeiro, but he moved to Dragões FC Porto (mainly reserve team). Sebá is a midfielder who can play in all fronts of the attack, although he is more efficient on one side.  With good ball striking and an advanced high speed, the Brazilian has yet to win on a consistent whole match and after a couple of matches in the Primeira Liga considered a new Hulk in power. Faced with increased competition, FC Porto however decided not to activate the clause allowing him to finally join the player and Estoril did not miss the opportunity.  Playing in the UEFA Europa League just months after being promoted to the first division, the Lusitanian club take advantage of its close relationship with the Brazilian company Traffic (Agency of players) that owns part of the rights of the player, to complete his transfer.

On 19 August 2015, Olympiakos confirmed the signing of Brazilian forward Sebá as the Greek champion tries boosted its squad ahead of the start of the new season. Sebá signed a four-year contract for a reported fee of €1.7 million and joined the Piraeus club from Portuguese side Estoril. The 23-year-old forward followed the footsteps of his fellow Portuguese and former manager at Estoril, Marco Silva, who took over as Olympiakos coach in the summer . On 5 December 2015, he scored his first goal with a low finish after taking the rebound from Jimmy Durmaz shot in the Superleague Greece in a 4-3 away victory against Panthrakikos.
On 7 January 2016, he scored in a 4–1 away win against Chania for the Greek Cup. He was named man of the match. On summer of 2016, Seba could be on the move as several clubs from Brazil have expressed an interest for his services. Moreover, he attracted interest from Mexican clubs in the past which is expected to be revived until the end of the window. Olympiakos seek for a fee in the region of €2 million for Seba and if an offer of that region comes in, then the Greek giants will accept the bid and the transfer will go through. Eventually he stayed in the club, as Paulo Bento is attracted from his abilities.

On 11 September 2016, he scored his first goal for the 2016–2017 season in a 6–1 home win against Veria. Despite his mediocre performance in the Superleague Greece, he scored repeatedly in UEFA Europa League. On mid April, reports in Turkey insist that Galatasaray will make a move to sign Olympiakos winger over the summer transfer window. Galatasaray has rubbished the rumours linking them with Seba, however reports in Turkey continue to link the Brazilian winger with Galatasaray. On 25 April 2017, Olympiakos winger faced a three-game suspension following his kick on Sergio Araujo in the semi-final of the Greek Cup against AEK. Seba is being accused for misconduct after his decision to kick AEK winger. He finished the 2016-17 season having three goals and 10 assists (1st in the League) and had a vital role in his club's seventh consecutive League title.

In contrary to an excellent 2016-17 season, Sebá didn't score a goal in 20 appearances in the first half of the 2017-18 season, and as he has hardly managed to be in Oscar García's choices, it is not excluded his retirement from the club as the winter transfer window is still open to Turkey, Russia and China.

On 3 July 2018, Sebá joined Chinese Super League side Chongqing Lifan, on loan from Olympiakos. After six months he returned to Olympiakos and during the winter transfer period he signed a three-and-a-half years' contract with Al-Shabab FC for an undisclosed fee.

Career statistics
As of 11 April 2019

Honours

Club
Porto

Primeira Liga: 2012–13
Olympiacos
Superleague Greece: 2015–16, 2016–17

Individual
Superleague Greece Assists Leader: 2016–17 (9 assists)

References

External links

1992 births
Living people
Brazilian footballers
Brazilian expatriate footballers
Campeonato Brasileiro Série A players
Primeira Liga players
Cruzeiro Esporte Clube players
FC Porto B players
FC Porto players
G.D. Estoril Praia players
Expatriate footballers in Portugal
Footballers at the 2011 Pan American Games
Association football forwards
Olympiacos F.C. players
Chongqing Liangjiang Athletic F.C. players
Al-Shabab FC (Riyadh) players
Ionikos F.C. players
Chinese Super League players
Saudi Professional League players
Expatriate footballers in China
Expatriate footballers in Greece
Expatriate footballers in Saudi Arabia
Brazilian expatriate sportspeople in China
Brazilian expatriate sportspeople in Greece
Brazilian expatriate sportspeople in Saudi Arabia
Pan American Games competitors for Brazil
Sportspeople from Salvador, Bahia